Searchlight on Japan is an Australian documentary about the Allied occupation of Japan after World War II directed by Ken G. Hall.

The film was sold to American television.

References

External links
Searchlight on Japan at Australian Screen Online
Searchlight on Japan at Australian War Memorial
Searchlight on Japan at National Film and Sound Archive

Australian documentary films